The 2011 World Rhythmic Gymnastics Championships was held in Montpellier, France, from September 19–25, 2011 at the Arena Montpellier. Only the top 24 groups from the 2010 World Rhythmic Gymnastics Championships were allowed to take part in the group competition this time. These championships were the first qualifying event for the 2012 Olympics which will be held in London. In the group all-around competition, the top 6 teams qualified directly for the Group Competition at the 2012 Olympics, while teams placed 7th to 12th will get a second chance to qualify at the London test event in January 2012 for additional four spots. In Individual all-around, the top 15 gymnasts in the World Championships earned a place in the Olympic competition for their respective countries (subject to a maximum of two per country) with further 5 places to be decided at the test event (maximum one per country).

Schedule

19.09.2011 Monday
10:00 - 13:30 Qualification (CI) - Individuals Group 1 & 2 (Hoop and Ball)
14:30 - 15:00 Opening ceremony
15:00 - 18:30 Qualification (CI) - Individuals Group 3 & 4 (Hoop and Ball)
20.09.2011 Tuesday
10:00 - 13:30 Qualification (CI) - Individuals Group 4 & 3 (Hoop and Ball)
15:00 - 18:30 Qualification (CI) - Individuals Group 2 & 1 (Hoop and Ball)
20:00 - 20:30 Individual Final (CIII) Hoop
20:30 - 21:00 Individual Final (CIII) Ball
21:00 - 21:15 Award ceremony Finals Hoop and Ball
21.09.2011 Wednesday
10:00 - 13:30 Qualification (CI) - Individuals Group 1 & 2 (Clubs and Ribbon)
15:00 - 18:30 Qualification (CI) - Individuals Group 3 & 4 (Clubs and Ribbon)
22.09.2011 Thursday
10:00 - 13:30 Qualification (CI) - Individuals Group 4 & 3 (Clubs and Ribbon)
15:00 - 18:30 Qualification (CI) - Individuals Group 2 & 1 (Clubs and Ribbon)
20:00 - 20:30 Individual Final (CIII) Clubs
20:30 - 21:00 Individual Final (CIII) Ribbon
21:00 - 21:15 Award ceremony Finals Clubs and Ribbon
21:15 - 21:25 Award ceremony Teams

23.09.2011 Friday
16:30 - 19:00 Individual All-Around Final (CII) Group B (rank 13-24)
20:00 - 22:30 Individual All-Around Final (CII) Group B (rank 1-12)
22:30 - 22:40 Longines Prize of Elegance
22:40 - 22:55 Award ceremony Individual All-Around
24.09.2011 Saturday
15:00 - 19:00 Group All-Around (CI)
19:00 - 19:15 Award ceremony Group All-Around
25.09.2011 Sunday
14:00 - 14:40 Group Final (CIII) 5 Balls
14:40 - 14:50 Award ceremony Group Final 5 Balls
15:00 - 15:40 Group Final (CIII) 3 Ribbons and 2 Hoops
15:40 - 15:50 Award ceremony Group Final 3 Ribbons and 2 Hoops
16:15 - 17:50 Gala and Closing ceremony

Medal winners

* reserve gymnast

Individual

Teams Competition and Individual Qualification
The competition was held from September 19 to September 22.

Hoop
The final was held on Tuesday, 20 September at 20:00 local time.

Ball
The final was held on Tuesday, 20 September at 20:30 local time.

Clubs
The final was held on Thursday, 22 September at 20:00 local time.

Ribbon
The final was held on Thursday, 22 September at 20:30 local time.

All-around
The final was held on Friday, 23 September at 16:30 local time.
The top 15 gymnasts earned a quota place for their respective countries at the 2012 Olympics.

Groups

Gymnasts
The following gymnasts took part in the group competition.

All-around
The competition was held on Saturday, 24 September at 15:00 local time.
The top 6 teams qualified for the 2012 Olympics. The teams ranked 7th-12th qualified for the test event.

5 Balls
The final will be held on Sunday, 25 September at 14:00 local time.

3 Ribbons + 2 Hoops
The final will be held on Sunday, 25 September at 15:00 local time.

Medal table

References

External links
Official website

World Rhythmic Gymnastics Championships
G
Rhythmic Gymnastics World Championships
Rhy